Richard Skuse (born 2 June 1980) is a Rugby union prop for Saracens in the Guinness Premiership.

Skuse was born in Bristol, and started his professional career playing for Bristol Shoguns. He joined London Irish in July 2004. An integral part of the London Irish squad, he also won representative honours with England at U21 level. Skuse's performances eventually earned him a call-up to 's squad. He joined Saracens for the 2009–10 season.

References

External links
Saracens profile
London Irish profile

1980 births
Living people
English rugby union players
Rugby union props
Saracens F.C. players
Rugby union players from Bristol